BBC First is an entertainment subscription television channel broadcasting in Australia. It is the localised version of the internationally available BBC First. The channel is wholly owned and operated by BBC Studios.

History
On 17 April 2013, it was announced that the BBC had forged a new exclusive deal with Australian subscription television provider Foxtel which would see a new channel launched that would feature comedy and drama content, with programming screening as close to their original UK transmission as possible.

The following day it was announced that this deal resulted in the end of a 50-year-old deal with Australian free-to-air broadcaster ABC which they were not consulted about. Despite the new exclusive deal with Foxtel, it does not affect 'grandfathering' agreements whereby series that are currently broadcasting on other networks are not affected and will remain on their current network. The programming that is shown on the new channel will not air on Australian free-to-air for at least 12 months after its first airing, if ever.

It was later announced the new channel would be named BBC First, a new global brand that would roll out in 2014, with Australia being the first location to launch the new channel. The Australian channel is available in linear format and in high definition, launching on 3 August 2014.

On 1 February 2015, BBC First launched on Australian IPTV service Fetch TV – ending Foxtel's exclusivity.

Programming
The channel targets affluent people aged between 25 and 54 years, with a specific target demographic of women aged 40–54 years.

Original programming

Banished

Acquired programming

A Young Doctor's Notebook
Alan Partridge: Welcome to the Places of My Life
Burton & Taylor
Call the Midwife (2015)
Dates
Dead Boss
Derek (series 2)
Dickensian
Episodes (seasons 3–4)
The Fall (series 2)
The Fear
The Game
The Honourable Woman
Luther
Midwinter of the Spirit
New Tricks (2015)
The Night Manager
The Musketeers
Peaky Blinders
The Politician's Husband
Quirke
War & Peace
Wolf Hall (11 April 2015)
The Village

References

External links

International BBC television channels
Television channels and stations established in 2014
Television networks in Australia
English-language television stations in Australia
2014 establishments in Australia